My Engineer  (My Engineer has a shop, has a gear, has a wife yet?) is a 2020 Thai BL television series starring Patpasit Na Songkhla (Cooper) and Kritsanapong Soonthornchatchawet (Poy).  The series was directed by Lit Samajarn, who is the also the director of SOTUS: The Series. The show was premiered in Thailand and aired from March 14, 2020, to May 30, 2020. The show was renewed for a sequel, to be released in sometime. A three episode vlog of the cast members vacation was released on YouTube from June 13, 2020, to June 27, 2020, with the title My Engineer Summer Trip.

Synopsis 
As a revenge for injuring his nose, the popular senior Engineering Student Bohn asks Duen (a first-year medical student) to bring a flower to him every morning for a month.  Further story explains how they fall for each other slowly. Meanwhile, the story also dwells around the relationship between King (Bohn's friend) and Ram (Duen's friend).  The story also unfolds Mek's unrequited love for Boss; both of them are Bohn's friends. Finally, the series explores the relationship between Frong, a Business student with Thara, a senior of Duen.

Cast 

 Patpasit Na Songkhla (Cooper) as Bohn
 Kritsanapong Soonthornchatchawet (Poy)  as Duen
 Talay Sanguandikul (Lay) as King 
 Nakhun Screaigh (Perth) as Ram
 Naphat Chalermphonphakdee (Inntouch) as Boss
 Ryan Peng as Mek 
 Nutchapol Cheevapanyaroj (Shane) as Frong
 Nutthapong Phibunthanakiet (MD) as Thara
 Atchari Siriboonphiphatana (Sosave) as Tee
 Nam Kankulnut as Ting
 Natid Kaveekornwong (Rice) as Tang
 Supatad Pongchaipoom (Toto) as Phu
 Alexander Bryant (Dylan) as Ruj (Ram's brother)
 Machida Sutthikunphanit (Maki) as Daoheni (Duen's sister)
 Aydin Cerrillo as Ben (Bohn's nephew)
 Kotnok Sukthangwong as Fon (Boss's Ex) 
 Thanyadit Thanatnat (Ko) as First (Frong's brother)
 Tak Ninmon Bunsachai as Khamfa (King's sister)
 Thonwak Hatlinha (Tiger) as Mild 
 Jirapat Phanngern as Duen's father
 Aa Rachameth Chaipichayarat as Ram's father
 Am Chonwari Chutiwatkhotrachai as Duen's mother
 Maniyanan Limsawat as Frong's mother
 Sunotri Chotiphan as King's mother

References

Thai boys' love television series
Thai comedy television series
2020s LGBT-related comedy television series